Karlos Montez Dansby (born November 3, 1981) is a former American football outside linebacker. He played college football for Auburn University and received All-American recognition. He was drafted by the Arizona Cardinals in the second round of the 2004 NFL Draft, and has also played for the Miami Dolphins, Cleveland Browns, and Cincinnati Bengals.

Early years
Dansby was an All-State linebacker and wide receiver at Woodlawn High School in Birmingham, Alabama, where he was a letterman in football, basketball, and track. He caught 51 passes for 857 yards and five touchdowns on offense, 81 tackles, six sacks, three interceptions, and two fumble recoveries on defense as a senior. In basketball, he played as a power forward, earning All-state honors as a junior. In track & field, he competed in the jumping events and got a PR of 6.73 meters in the long jump as a junior.

College career
Dansby played for the Auburn Tigers football team while attending Auburn University from 2000 to 2003.  He was a Butkus Award semi-finalist regarded as one of the premier defenders in college football. While he began his Auburn career at wide receiver, he shifted to outside linebacker as a sophomore. In 36 games for the Tigers, he recorded 218 tackles (128 solos) with 10 quarterback sacks, 31 stops for losses, seven forced fumbles, two fumble recoveries, 15 pass deflections, and eight interceptions for 107 yards in returns.  He was First-team All-America and a first-team All-Southeastern Conference selection as a senior when he had 84 tackles (50 solo), 5.5 sacks, 13 stops for losses, 6 pass deflections, 4 caused fumbles. In 2002, he was a First-team All-SEC with 76 tackles (32 solo), 4 sacks, 10 stops for losses, 3 interceptions, 4 pass deflections, 2 fumble recoveries, and 2 caused fumbles.

Professional career

Arizona Cardinals
The Arizona Cardinals selected Dansby in the second round (33rd overall) of the 2004 NFL Draft. Dansby was the third linebacker drafted in 2004.

On August 4, 2004, the Arizona Cardinals signed Dansby to a four-year, $3.95 million contract that includes a signing bonus of $2.45 million.

Throughout training camp, Dansby competed to be a starting outside linebacker against Levar Woods. Head coach Dennis Green named Dansby the backup outside linebacker to start the regular season in 2004, behind Levar Woods and James Darling.

He started in the Arizona Cardinals' season-opener at the St. Louis Rams and made two solo tackles in their 17–10 loss. On September 26, 2004, Dansby earned his first career start after surpassing Levar Woods on the Cardinals' depth chart. Dansby recorded four combined tackles and made his first career sack on quarterback Michael Vick during a 6–3 loss at the Atlanta Falcons in Week 3. In Week 7, he recorded two combined tackles, two pass deflections, and made his first career interception during a 25–17 victory against the Seattle Seahawks. On November 14, 2004, Dansby recorded five solo tackles, deflected a pass, and made two sacks on quarterback Kurt Warner before exiting in the fourth quarter of the Cardinals' 17–14 victory against the New York Giants in Week 10. He was inactive during the Cardinals' Week 11 loss at the Carolina Panthers due to a neck injury he sustained the previous week. In Week 13, he collected a season-high seven solo tackles in a 26–12 loss at the Detroit Lions. Dansby finished his rookie season in 2004 with 60 combined tackles (43 solo), five sacks, five pass deflections, an interception, and a forced fumble in 15 games and 11 starts.

Dansby entered training camp slated as a starting outside linebacker in 2005. Head coach Dennis Green named Dansby and Orlando Huff the starting outside linebackers to start the regular season. He started in the Arizona Cardinals' season-opener against the New York Giants and recorded three solo tackles, two pass deflections, two interceptions, a sack, and scored the first touchdown of his career during a 42–19 loss. Dansby intercepted a pass by Giants' quarterback Eli Manning and returned it for an 18-yard touchdown in the second quarter. In Week 7, he collected a season-high 11 combined tackles (nine solo) and made a sack in the Cardinals' 20–10 victory against the Tennessee Titans. He was sidelined during a Week 11 victory at the St. Louis Rams after suffering a groin injury. On December 24, 2005, he made four solo tackles, a pass deflection, and returned an interception by quarterback Mike McMahon for an 11-yard touchdown in a 27–21 win against the Philadelphia Eagles. He finished the 2005 season with 88 combined tackles (69 solo), four sacks, four pass deflections, three interceptions, and two touchdowns in 15 games and 15 starts.

In 2007, he started all 14 games he played and led team with 117 tackles, marking second season with 100+ tackles (103 in 2005).  On February 14, 2008, he was given the Cardinals' franchise tag. He has been franchised twice by Arizona, in 2008 and 2009.  Cardinals signed franchised Dansby to a one-year, $8.065 million contract. In 2008, Dansby led the Cardinals to the Super Bowl while again totaling over 100 tackles and making 4 sacks and intercepting two passes. Karlos Dansby's 2009 franchise tag guaranteed him $9.7 million in salary in 2009 and would make him an unrestricted free agent in 2010.

In a first-round playoff game against the Green Bay Packers on January 10, 2010, Dansby recovered a fumble in overtime by Green Bay quarterback Aaron Rodgers and returned it 17 yards for the game-winning touchdown in the highest scoring game in NFL postseason history.

Miami Dolphins
On March 5, 2010, Dansby signed with the Miami Dolphins to a five-year, $43 million contract with $22 million guaranteed, which made it the richest contract for an inside linebacker in NFL history until Patrick Willis signed a five-year, $50 million contract with the San Francisco 49ers. Dansby was released from the team on March 12, 2013.

Arizona Cardinals (second stint)
On May 10, 2013, Dansby signed a one-year deal to return to the Arizona Cardinals.

Cleveland Browns

On March 11, 2014, Dansby signed a four-year, $24 million contract with the Cleveland Browns. The deal included $14 million guaranteed.

He was released by the Browns on March 16, 2016.

Cincinnati Bengals
Dansby signed with the Cincinnati Bengals on March 29, 2016.

Arizona Cardinals (third stint)
On March 10, 2017, Dansby signed a one-year contract with the Cardinals. In Week 9, Dansby picked off C. J. Beathard in a 20–10 win over the 49ers, earning him NFC Defensive Player of the Week. He retired at the end of the season having never been selected for a Pro Bowl despite having more career tackles than Hall of Famer Brian Urlacher; he had 1,422 tackles to Urlacher's 1,361. However, he played on mostly mediocre teams for most of his career; he only made the playoffs twice and played on a winning team only one other time.

NFL career statistics

Personal life
Dansby trains at EVO Ultrafit in Phoenix, AZ. His family is from Birmingham, AL.

References

External links
Cleveland Browns bio 
ESPN Player Profile

1981 births
Living people
Players of American football from Birmingham, Alabama
African-American players of American football
American football linebackers
Auburn Tigers football players
Arizona Cardinals players
Miami Dolphins players
Cleveland Browns players
Cincinnati Bengals players
People from Southwest Ranches, Florida
21st-century African-American sportspeople
20th-century African-American people